Savannah Centre for Contemporary Art is a centre of arts initiated by Ibrahim Mahamah in Tamale, Ghana. The centre is a space where artist run projects, exhibitions and research hub, cultural repository and more.

Exhibitions 

 Akutia: Blindfolding the Sun and the Poetics of Peace by Agyeman Ossei, ‘Dota’ (Co-Curators Adwoa)
 In pursuit of something beautiful, perhaps... (A retrospective) by Curator Bernard Akoi-Jackson (PhD) Location

References 

Artist-run centres
Performing arts companies
Arts in Ghana
Tamale, Ghana